P. R. Rajan, a politician from the Communist Party of India (Marxist), was a Member of the Parliament of India, representing Kerala in the Rajya Sabha, the upper house of the Indian Parliament. He died in 2014.

External links
 Profile on Rajya Sabha website

Communist Party of India (Marxist) politicians from Kerala
Rajya Sabha members from Kerala
1930s births
2014 deaths